Heliura amazonicum is a moth of the subfamily Arctiinae. It was described by Rothschild in 1912. It is found in Brazil (Amazonas).

References
Notes

Bibliography
 Natural History Museum Lepidoptera generic names catalog

Arctiinae
Moths described in 1912